The following is a list of characters in the Chinese classical 16th century novel Journey to the West, including those mentioned by name only.

Main characters

Sun Wukong ("Monkey King", 孙悟空)

Tang Sanzang ("Tripitaka", 唐三藏)

Zhu Bajie ("Pigsy", 豬八戒)

Sha Wujing ("Sandy", 沙悟淨)

The White Dragon Horse (白龍馬)

Buddhist pantheon

 The Tathāgata Buddha (如來佛)

 Avalokiteśvara (觀世音菩薩), better known as Guanyin Bodhisattva (觀音菩薩) or simply Guanyin (觀音) in the novel.
 
 Moksa (莫克薩)

 Dipankara (燃燈古佛)

 Maitreya (彌勒佛), as his most well-known incarnation, Budai (布袋和尚) in the novel.

 Manjusri (文殊菩薩)

 Samantabhadra (普賢菩薩)

 Ksitigarbha (地藏王菩薩)

 Lingji Bodhisattva (靈吉菩薩), might be based on Mahasthamaprapta.

 Pilanpo Bodhisattva (毗藍婆菩薩), might be based on Ākāśagarbha.

 The Eighteen Arhats (十八羅漢)

 Master Puti (菩提祖師), might be based on Subhuti.

 Ananda (阿難)

 Mahākāśyapa (伽葉)

 Mahamayuri (孔雀明王)

 Ratnadhvaja (寶幢光王佛), might be based on Amitābha.

 Niaoge Daolin (乌巢禅师)

 The Twenty-Four Protective Deities (二十四諸天), appearing as a group, with most individual members unnamed except for:
 Hariti (鬼子母)
 Yama (閻羅王)
 The Four Heavenly Kings (四大天王):
 Vaiśravaṇa (多聞天王)
 Virūḍhaka (增長天王)
 Dhṛtarāṣṭra (持國天王)
 Virūpākṣa (廣目天王)

 The Eight Wisdom Kings (八大金剛), appearing as a group, with individual members.

 The Five Gate (五方揭諦):
 Golden Light Gate (金光揭諦)
 Silver Headed Gate (銀頭揭諦)
 Pāragate (波羅揭諦)
 Pārasaṃgate (波羅僧揭諦)
 Mahagate (摩訶揭諦)

 The Ten Yama Kings (十代冥王):
 Jiang, King Qinguang (秦廣王蔣)
 Li, King Chujiang (楚江王歷)
 Yu, King Songdi (宋帝王余)
 Lü, King Wuguan (五官王呂)
 Bao, King Yama (閻羅王包)
 Bi, King Biancheng (卞城王畢)
 Dong, King Taishan (泰山王董)
 Huang, King Dushi (都市王黃)
 Lu, King Pingdeng (平等王陸)
 Xue, King Zhuanlun (轉輪王薛)

Taoist pantheon

 The Jade Emperor (玉皇大帝)

 The Queen Mother of the West (西王母)

 The Three Pure Ones (三清):
 Yuanshi Tianzun (元始天尊)
 Lingbao Tianzun (靈寶天尊), also known as Taishang Daojun (太上道君).
 Daode Tianzun (道德天尊), also known as Taishang Laojun (太上老君).

 Xuan Wu (玄武), also known as Zhenwu Great Emperor (真武大帝).
 Turtle and Snake generals (龜蛇二將):
 Taixuan Shuijing Heiling Zunshen (太玄水精黑靈尊神)
 Taixuan Huojing Chiling Zunshen (太玄火精赤靈尊神)
 Little Zhang Crown Prince (小張太子)
 The Five Sacred Dragons (五大神龍)

 The Five Elders of the Five Positions:
 Chong'en Holy Emperor of the East
 Xuanling Doumu Yuanjun of the North (北方北極玄靈鬥姆元君)
 Yellow Horn Immortal of the Central (中央黃極黃角大仙)

 Watcher deities:
 Gao Ming (高明), also known as Thousand Li Eye (千里眼).
 Gao Jue (高覺), also known as Wind Following Ear (順風耳).

 Weather deities:
 Duke of Thunder (雷公)
 Mother of Lightning (電母)
 Marquis of Wind (風伯)
 Master of Rain (雨師)

 Devil King of Great Strength (大力鬼王)

 The Lords of the Five Elements (五炁真君):
 Wood Lord of the East (東方歲星木德真君)
 Fire Lord of the South (南方熒惑火德真君)
 Metal Lord of the West (西方太白金德真君), also known as Taibai Jinxing (太白金星).
 Water Lord of the North (北方辰星水德真君)
 Earth Lord of the Central (中央鎮星土德真君)

 The Barefoot Immortal (赤腳大仙)

 Deity of the Moon (太陰星君), also known as Chang'e (嫦娥), Guanghan Fairy (廣寒仙子) or Heng'e Fairy (姮娥仙子).

 Deity of the Sun (太陽星君)

 Marshals:
 Marshal of the Heavenly Canopy (天蓬元帥)
 Marshal of Heavenly Blessing (天佑元帥)

 Patrol deities:
 Day Patrol Deity (日遊神)
 Night Patrol Deity (夜遊神)

 The Twelve Earthly Branches (十二元辰):
 Zi (子)
 Chou (丑)
 Yin (寅)
 Mao (卯)
 Chen (辰)
 Si (巳)
 Wu (午)
 Wei (未)
 Shen (申)
 You (酉)
 Xu (戌)
 Hai (亥)

 The Nine Stars (九曜星):
 Gold Star/Metal Star (金星)/Taibai Jinxing (太白金星)
 Wood Star (木星)
 Water Star (水星)
 Fire Star (火星)
 Earth Star (土星)
 Erode Star (蝕星)
 Jidu Star (計都星)
 Ziqi Star (紫炁星)
 Yuebo Star (月孛星)

 Li Jing (李靖), the Pagoda Bearing Heavenly King (托塔天王).

 Jinzha (金吒)

 Muzha (木吒), also known as Hui'an (惠岸).

 Nezha (哪吒)

 Juling Shen (巨靈神)

 Erlang Shen (二郎神)

 Taiyi Leisheng Yinghua Tianzun (太乙雷聲應化天尊), also known as Wen Zhong.

 Taiyi Jiuku Tianzun (太乙救苦天尊), also known as Taiyi Zhenren (太乙真人).

 Wang Shan (王善), the Keeper of Spirits (靈官)

 Emperor Wenchang (文昌帝君)

 Zhenyuan Daxian (鎮元大仙)

 The 28 Mansions (二十八宿):
 Azure Dragon of the East (東方青龍)
 Wood Dragon of Horn (角木蛟)
 Golden Dragon of Neck (亢金龍)
 Earth Badger of Root (氐土貉)
 Sun Rabbit of Room (房日兔)
 Moon Vixen of Heart (心月狐)
 Fire Tiger of Tail (尾火虎)
 Water Leopard of Winnowing Basket (箕水豹)
 Black Tortoise of the North (北方玄武)
 Wood Insect of Dipper (斗木獬)
 Golden Ox of Ox (牛金牛)
 Earth Bat of Girl (女土蝠)
 Sun Rat of Emptiness (虛日鼠)
 Moon Swallow of Rooftop (危月燕)
 Fire Pig of Encampment (室火豬)
 Water Pangolin of Wall (壁水貐)
 White Tiger of the West (西方白虎)
 Wood Wolf of Legs (奎木狼)
 Golden Dog of Bond (婁金狗)
 Earth Pheasant of Stomach (胃土雉)
 Sun Rooster of Hairy Head (昴日雞), Maori Xingguan (昴日星官)
 Moon Bird of Net (畢月烏)
 Fire Monkey of Turtle Beak (觜火猴)
 Water Ape of Three Stars (參水猿)
 Vermilion Bird of the South (南方朱雀)
 Wood Dog of Well (井木犴)
 Golden Sheep of Ghost (鬼金羊)
 Earth Deer of Willow (柳土獐)
 Sun Horse of Star (星日馬)
 Moon Deer of Extended Net (張月鹿)
 Fire Serpent of Wings (翼火蛇)
 Water Earthworm of Chariot (軫水蚓)

 The Four Time Guardians (四值功曹):
 Li Bing, Guardian of Years (值年神李丙)
 Huang Chengyi, Guardian of Months (值月神黃承乙)
 Zhou Deng, Guardian of Days (值日神周登)
 Liu Hong, Guardian of Hours (值時神劉洪)

 The Four Heavenly Masters (四大天師):
 Zhang Daoling (張道陵)
 Xu Xun (許遜), also known as Xu Jingzhi (許敬之) or Xu Jingyang (許旌陽).
 Qiu Hongji (邱弘濟)
 Ge Hong (葛洪)

 The Three Stars of Luck, Prosperity and Longevity (福祿壽三星):
 Star of Luck (福星)
 Star of Prosperity (祿星)
 Star of Longevity (壽星)

 The Six Ding (六丁):
 Jade Maiden of Yin (陰神玉女)
 Sima Qing of Dingmao (丁卯神司馬卿)
 Cui Juqing of Dingyi (丁已神崔巨卿)
 Shi Shutong of Dingwei (丁未神石叔通)
 Zang Wengong of Dingyou (丁酉神臧文公)
 Zhang Wentong of Dinghai (丁亥神張文通)
 Zhao Ziyu of Dingchou (丁丑神趙子玉)

 The Six Jia (六甲):
 Jade Man of Yang (陽神玉男)
 Wang Wenqing of Jiazi (甲子神王文卿)
 Zhan Zijiang of Jiaxu (甲戌神展子江)
 Hu Wenchang of Jiashen (甲申神扈文長)
 Wei Yuqing of Jiawu (甲午神衛玉卿)
 Meng Feiqing of Jiachen (甲辰神孟非卿)
 Ming Wenzhang of Jiayin (甲寅神明文章)

 The Six Stars of the South Formation (南斗六星):
 Star of Life (司命星君)
 Star of Prosperity (司祿星君)
 Star of Longevity (延壽星君)
 Star of Benefit (益算星君)
 Star of Adversity (度厄星君)
 Star of Birth (上生星君)

 The Seven Stars of the North Formation (北斗七星), based on the Big Dipper:
 Greedy Wolf Star of Sunlight (陽明貪狼星君), based on the Dubhe.
 Giant Gate Star of Dark Essence (陰精巨門星君), based on the Merak.
 Lasting Prosperity Star of True Man (真人祿存星君), based on the Phecda.
 Civil Star of Mystery and Darkness (玄冥文曲星君), based on the Megrez.
 Danyuan Star of Honesty and Chasity (丹元廉貞星君), based on the Alioth.
 Military Star of the North Pole (北極武曲星君), based on the Mizar.
 Army Defeating Star of Heaven's Gate (天關破軍星君), based on the Alkaid.

 The Dragon Kings of the Four Seas (四海龍王):
 Ao Guang, Dragon King of the East Sea (東海龍王敖廣)
 Ao Qin, Dragon King of the South Sea (南海龍王敖欽)
 Ao Shun, Dragon King of the North Sea (北海龍王敖順)
 Ao Run, Dragon King of the West Sea (西海龍王敖閏)

 Jialan, Guardian of Eighteen Places (一十八位護教伽藍)

 Lishan Laomu (驪山老母)

 The City God (城隍)

 Tudigong (土地公), the Earth Deity (土地神)

 The Mountain Deity (山神)

Antagonists

Demon King of Confusion
The Demon King of Confusion (混世魔王) is a demon king who seizes control of the Water Curtain Cave (水簾洞) when Sun Wukong left to learn magic from Subhuti. He chases away the primates and occupies the cave with his minions. Many years later, Sun Wukong returns, defeats the demon king and takes back the cave.

General Yin, Xiong Shanjun and Techu Shi
General Yin (寅將軍), Xiong Shanjun (熊山君; literally "Bear Mountain Lord"), and Techu Shi (特處士; literally "Occupier of a Special Place") are the first three demons Tang Sanzang encounters on his journey. Their true forms are a dark-yellow furred tiger, a black bear and a yellow buffalo respectively. They ambush Tang Sanzang and his two escorts at Shuangcha Ridge (雙叉嶺) and capture them. The escorts killed and eaten by the demons. Taibai Jinxing, in disguise as an old man, comes to free Tang Sanzang and leads him to safety.

Black Wind Demon and associates

The Black Wind Demon (黑風怪) is based in a cave on Black Wind Mountain (黑風山). His true form is a black bear but he appears as a dark-complexioned man armed with a Black Tassel Spear. He steals Tang Sanzang's cassock during a fire. Sun Wukong goes to confront him later to take back the cassock but the demon flees everytime so he seeks help from Guanyin. The Black Wind Demon eventually surrenders to Guanyin and becomes the mountain's guardian deity.

The Scholar in a White Robe (白衣秀士) and Lingxuzi (淩虛子) are the Black Wind Demon's friends. The three are having a conversation when Sun Wukong shows up. The scholar is killed by Sun Wukong and is revealed to be actually a white floral patterned snake, while the other two escape. Lingxuzi was preparing magical pills as gifts for Black Wind Demon when he encounters Sun Wukong again, who recognises him and kills him. Lingxuzi is actually a gray wolf in disguise as a Taoist.

The Jinchi Elder (金池长老) is the abbot of the Guanyin Monastery (观音禅院) and the Black Wind Demon's companion. He met Tang Sanzang and his disciple Sun Wukong who stayed at his temple for one night. At the monastery, Wukong bragged about his master's cassock to the monks, which surprised the abbot and wanted it. The abbot wanted Tang Sanzang's cassock forever so badly that he plotted to set fire to his temple trying to burn Tang Sanzang and his disciple. When Wukong knew about this, he guarded his master inside the building he's sleeping. Therefore, burning all of the buildings in the temple except the building his master's in. However, when the Black Wind Demon came to the burning temple, he saw Tang Sanzang's cassock and stole it. When the abbot tried to find Sanzang's cassock, it was gone. As a result, the abbot died soon.

Yellow Wind Demon
The Yellow Wind Demon (黃風怪) is based in Yellow Wind Cave (黃風洞) at Yellow Wind Ridge (黃風嶺). He is capable of blowing samadhi wind. He captures Tang Sanzang and wants to eat him. Sun Wukong enlists the help of Lingji Bodhisattva to subdue the demon, who is revealed to be actually a yellow marten from Vulture Peak. The bodhisattva captures the demon and brings him back to Vulture Peak.

The Tiger Vanguard (虎先鋒) is a minion of the Yellow Wind Demon. He comes to Sun Wukong and Zhu Bajie in a whirlwind, but Wukong realises it's a demon and attacks and while the disciples are pursuing him he rips apart his skin to fool them and whirls it on a rock to escape and kidnap Tang Sanzang. He is killed by Zhu Bajie and is revealed to be a tiger.

Immortal Zhenyuan

Immortal Zhenyuan (鎮元大仙), also known as Zhenyuanzi (鎮元子), is the patriarch of all earthbound immortals. He is based in Wuzhuang Temple (五莊觀) on Longevity Mountain (萬壽山) in West Continent (西牛賀洲). In his temple, there is a special Ginsengfruit (人參果) tree that produces only 30 fruits every 10,000 years. The fruit is shaped like an infant less than three days old; a person who just smells the fruit can extend his lifespan by 365 years, while a person who eats the fruit can live for another 48,000 years. Zhenyuan was away when the protagonists arrive at his temple on their journey, but he had instructed his servants Qingfeng (清風; literally "Clear Breeze") and Mingyue (明月; literally "Bright Moon") earlier to give two fruits to Tang Sanzang, as he knew Sanzang in his previous incarnation as Golden Cicada. Tang Sanzang is frightened when he sees that the fruit looks like a premature infant and refuses to eat it. Qingfeng and Mingyue then eat the fruits themselves and is seen by Zhu Bajie. Sun Wukong however, steals another three fruits for himself and his two juniors. When Qingfeng and Mingyue realize that some fruits are missing, they accuse Sun Wukong of theft and calls the pilgrims names. Sun Wukong destroys the Ginseng fruit tree in anger and escapes with his companions. When Zhenyuan returns to his temple, he is furious after learning the truth from Qingfeng and Mingyue. He pursues the protagonists and captures them twice after they attempt to flee again. The conflict is eventually resolved when Sun Wukong gets Shouxing (壽星) to help them restore the Ginseng fruit tree back to life. Zhenyuan is so pleased that he gives up his desire for revenge and becomes sworn brothers with Sun Wukong. He treats all of them to a thank you gift before seeing them off on their journey.

White Bone Demon

The White Bone Demon, better known as Baigujing (白骨精) and Lady White Bone, is one of the main villains in Journey to the West. She tricks Sanzang three times to believe that Sun Wukong has murdered innocent people. Sanzang then banishes Wukong and he is captured by the Yellow Robe Demon later.

Yellow Robe Demon

The Yellow Robe Demon (黃袍怪) is based in Moon Waves Cave (波月洞) on Bowl Mountain (碗子山) in the Kingdom of Baoxiang (寶象國). He is later revealed to be a guise assumed by Kui Mulang (the Wood Wolf of Legs; 奎木狼), a star spirit, and one of the 28 Mansions. He fell in love with a Jade Maiden in Heaven name Yunü (玉女) and decided to elope with her. He became a demon lord while she was reincarnated into the human world as "Baihuaxiu" (百花羞), the third princess of the Kingdom of Baoxiang. The demon kidnaps the princess (though she has no memory of her existence as a Jade Maiden), marries her for 13 years and has two children with her. He captures Tang Sanzang when the latter passes by the mountain. Zhu Bajie and Sha Wujing try to save their master but are no match for the demon. Zhu Bajie goes to bring back Sun Wukong – who was previously banished by Tang Sanzang after killing the White Bone Demon – to help them. Sun Wukong obviously defeats the demon, which mysteriously vanishes after his defeat. Wukong then seeks help from Heaven to track down the demon and learn his true identity. The Jade Emperor discovers that one of the 28 Mansions is missing, so he orders the remaining 27 to subdue the demon. The Wood Wolf is then subdued and brought to court, where as punishment he is ordered to become a furnace keeper under Taishang Laojun.

Golden and Silver Horned Kings and associates
The Golden Horned King (金角大王) and Silver Horned King (銀角大王) are two demon brothers and kings based in the Lotus Cave (蓮花洞), up-upon Flat Peak Mountain (平頂山). They capture Tang Sanzang and his companions by deception, and pin down Sun Wukong under three mountains. Sun Wukong escapes with the help of the local mountain deities and uses trickery and disguise to rob the demons of their weapons and special items, the 5 sacred treasures; the Purple Gold Red Gourd (紫金紅葫蘆), Suet Jade Flask (羊脂玉淨瓶), Golden Cloth Rope (幌金繩), Seven Stars Sword (七星劍) and Palm Leaf Fan (芭蕉扇). Sun Wukong then traps the demons in the gourd and frees Tang Sanzang and the others. Just as they are preparing to continue on their journey, Taishang Laojun appears and tells them that the two demon kings are actually the two boys in charge of watching over his furnaces. They escaped when he was not around and went out to cause trouble. He claims back all the things, the 5 sacred treasures, that Sun Wukong had taken from the demons and brings the boys back to Heaven.

Hu A'qi (狐阿七) is, supposedly, the maternal-uncle of the two demon kings. He is killed by Zhu Bajie, and is revealed to be actually a fox.

The Nine-Tailed Vixen (九尾狐狸) is based in the Dragon Suppressing Cave (壓龍洞) up-upon Dragon Suppressing Mountain (壓龍山). She is, supposedly, the mother of the two demon kings and is disguised as an old woman. Her sons send their minions to fetch her to Flat Peak Mountain. Sun Wukong ambushes her along the way and kills her.

Lion-Lynx Demon
The Lion-Lynx Demon (獅猁怪) is actually the Azure Lion (青毛獅子), the steed of the bodhisattva Manjusri. He drowns the king of Wuji Kingdom (烏雞國) by throwing him down-in a well and impersonates him for three years. The ghost of the dead king later appears to Tang Sanzang in a dream and begs him for help. Tang Sanzang sends Sun Wukong and Zhu Bajie to retrieve the king’s body from the well and use a magical Pill of Immortality from Taishang Laojun to bring the king back to life. They then go and expose the demon's true identity in the king's court. The demon then disguises himself as Tang Sanzang to confuse Sun Wukong, but his cover is blown when he cannot recite the "Ring Tightening Mantra" that gives Sun Wukong a headache. The bodhisattva Manjusri shows up, stops Sun Wukong from killing the demon, and explains that he is following the Buddha's instruction to allow his steed to serve as an obstacle for the protagonists so as to test their resolution to complete their quest. Apart from that, Manjusri once disguised himself as a monk and visited the king of Wuji, but the king had him tied up and thrown into the river for three days and three nights. The king got his retribution when he was stuck in the well for three years. Manjusri takes back the Azure Lion.

Tuolong
Tuolong (鼉龍; literally "Water Lizard Dragon") is located in Black River (黑水河) in Hengyang Valley (衡陽峪). He is actually the ninth son of the Dragon King of the Jing River (涇河龍王), and was placed there by Guanyin to serve as an obstacle for the protagonists. Tuolong is armed with a Bamboo Linked Bronze Club (竹節鋼鞭). He disguises himself as a boatman, pretends to ferry the protagonists across the river, and captures Tang Sanzang when they are unaware. Tuolong is eventually subdued and taken away by his cousin Crown Prince Mo'ang (摩昂太子), the eldest son of the Dragon King of the West Sea.

Immortals of Tiger, Elk, and Antelope Power
The Immortal of Tiger Power (虎力大仙), Immortal of Elk Power (鹿力大仙), and Immortal of Antelope Power (羊力大仙) are three demons who disguise themselves as Taoist magicians to deceive the ruler of the Kingdom of Chechi (車遲國). They become the king’s royal advisers. As their names suggest, their true forms are a tiger, an elk and an antelope respectively. Sun Wukong competes with them in a contest of magic powers and lures them into meeting their respective ends: Tiger is beheaded; Elk is disemboweled; Antelope is fried in boiling oil.

King of Spiritual Touch
The King of Spiritual Touch (靈感大王) is a demon based in Heaven Reaching River (通天河). He is armed with a Nine Petals Bronze Hammer (九瓣銅錘). He terrorises the people living near the river and demands that they sacrifice a boy and a girl to him every year or he will cause flooding. He is no match for Sun Wukong and retreats back to his underwater lair. Sun Wukong learns from Guanyin later that the demon is actually her pet goldfish from a lotus pond at Mount Putuo, who had obtained his powers after listening to Guanyin lecturing scriptures to her disciples every day. Guanyin uses a fish basket to trap the demon and bring him back to the pond.

Single Horned Rhinoceros King
The Single Horned Rhinoceros King (獨角兕大王) is a demon king based in Golden Pouch Cave (金兜洞) on Golden Pouch Mountain (金兜山). He is armed with a Bronze Spear (點鋼槍). He is actually Taishang Laojun's Azure Bull. He stole his master's Golden Jade Ring (金剛琢) an alternate form of the diamond snare that Laojun had made and used to capture Sun Wukong back during his war with heaven—and escaped from Heaven to cause trouble. He captures Tang Sanzang and his companions, except for Sun Wukong. When fighting with Sun Wukong, the demon uses the Golden Jade Ring to suck away Sun Wukong's Ruyi Jingu Bang. Sun Wukong seeks help from various celestial forces, including Li Jing, Nezha, the fire deities and the Eighteen Arhats, but all of them also lose their weapons to the demon's Golden Jade Ring. The demon is eventually subdued and taken back by Taishang Laojun, once he's made aware of the trouble it is making.

Immortal Ruyi
Immortal Ruyi (如意真仙) is Bull Demon King's brother. He is based in Immortal Gathering Temple (聚仙庵) on Mount Jieyang (解陽山) in Women's Country (女兒國). While in Women's Country, Tang Sanzang and Zhu Bajie unsuspectingly drink from the Spring of Pregnancy and become pregnant. The only cure is to drink from the Spring of Abortion (落胎泉), which is under Ruyi's control. When the women in Women's Country want to drink from the spring, they need to present gifts to Ruyi first. Ruyi holds a grudge against Sun Wukong because of the fate of his nephew, Red Boy, and he behaves in a hostile manner when Sun comes to ask for water from the spring. Ruyi is eventually outwitted and defeated by Sun Wukong.

Ruler of Women's Country
The Ruler of Women's Country (女兒國國王) is the ruler of a nation in Xiliang (西梁) with an all-female population — reminiscent of Amazons. When the protagonists arrive in her country, she hears that Tang Sanzang is the oath brother of Tang Dynasty's Emperor and decides to marry him. On Sun Wukong's suggestion, Tang Sanzang pretends to marry the ruler and lies that his three students will go to fetch the scriptures in place of him. The Ruler of Women's Country believes Sanzang and treats them with great ceremony. After the ceremony, she sends the three students off the city with Sanzang and is told by Sanzang that he's leaving with his students. The Ruler of Women's Country is shocked when the Scorpion Demoness suddenly appears and takes Sanzang away. She feels ashamed after all the students fly away to catch up with the Demoness and goes back to her palace.

Scorpion Demoness
The Scorpion Demoness (蠍子精) is a demoness based in Pipa Cave (琵琶洞) on Venom Mountain (毒敵山). Her true form is a giant scorpion as large as a pipa. She practises Taoist arts for several years and obtains magical powers. She once listened to the Buddha reciting scriptures in Leiyin Temple (雷音寺) and stung him with the poisonous sting on her tail when he brushed her aside. The Buddha suffers from the pain of the sting and instructs his followers to bring the Scorpion to him but she has already fled. Shortly after escaping from Women's Country, Tang Sanzang is abducted by the Scorpion Demoness and taken back to her lair, where she tries to seduce Tang Sanzang to marry her. Sun Wukong and Zhu Bajie fight with the Scorpion but are held back by her poisonous sting. The scorpion goes back to her cave and brings Sanzang into the bridal suite she prepares. She entices Sanzang for the whole night, but gets annoyed when Sanzang doesn't agree to marry her. Sun Wukong and Zhu Bajie comes again the next day and are held back by her poisonous sting again. Guanyin then comes to instruct the students to find Maori Xingguan (卯日星官) for help. The Scorpion is eventually killed by Maori Xingguan, who transforms into a giant rooster with two combs.

Six-Eared Macaque
The Six-Eared Macaque (六耳獼猴) is one of the four spiritual primates that do not belong to any of the ten categories that all beings in the universe are classified under. The other three are the Intelligent Stone Monkey (靈明石猴), Red Bottomed Horse Monkey (赤尻馬猴) and Long Armed Ape Monkey (通臂猿猴). As he and Sun Wukong are both spiritual primates (Sun Wukong is the Intelligent Stone Monkey), their powers and abilities are on par. Hoping to replace Sun Wukong and gain his rewards from the Buddha in Sun Wukong's place, the Six Eared Macaque first appears in Xiliang (西粱) in disguise as Sun Wukong, knocks Tang Sanzang unconscious and steals the baggage and paperwork. He fights with the real Sun Wukong and neither of them is able to overcome his opponent. No one is able to differentiate between the real and the fake Sun Wukong--the Six Eared Macaque's spell of impersonation is so-good that he also responds to the 'headache sutra', preventing the pilgrims from differentiating between him and Sun Wukong—until the two appear before the Buddha, who tells them about the four spiritual primates. The Six Eared Macaque attempts to flee when he hears the Buddha speak about his true identity, but the Buddha traps him under a giant golden alms bowl. The macaque is then killed by Sun Wukong.  The Six Eared Macaque's name and tactic are a likely nod to an old saying that "a secret is not safe between six ears".

Bull Demon King, Princess Iron Fan, Red Boy, and associates

Bull Demon King

The Bull Demon King (牛魔王) is a demon king based in Sky Scraping Cave (摩雲洞) on Accumulated Thunder Mountain (積雷山). In the early chapters of the novel, he becomes sworn brothers with Sun Wukong and five other demon kings; the seven of them becoming a Fraternity. He is ranked the most senior of the seven, and styles himself "Great Sage Who Pacifies Heaven" (平天大聖). He marries Princess Iron Fan and has a son, Red Boy, with her. He appears again in a later chapter when the protagonists arrive at the Flaming Mountains along their journey. Sun Wukong disguises himself as Bull Demon King to deceive Princess Iron Fan and takes away her Banana Leaf Fan. The real Bull Demon King visits Princess Iron Fan, who then realises she has been tricked. In retaliation, the Bull Demon King disguises himself as Zhu Bajie to trick Sun Wukong and retrieves the fan. In the ensuing fight against Sun Wukong and Zhu Bajie, Bull Demon King reveals his true form, a giant white bull, and attempts to charge towards his opponents. Nezha shows up, captures Bull Demon King, and brings him to Heaven to let the Jade Emperor decide his fate.

Princess Iron Fan

Princess Iron Fan (鐵扇公主) is Bull Demon King's wife and Red Boy's mother, she wields a Banana Leaf Fan capable of creating strong winds, she is actually an immortal from Heaven before marrying her husband.

Red Boy

Red Boy (紅孩兒) is the ferocious son of the Bull Demon King and Princess Iron Fan. Upon hearing about Tang Sanzang's arrival to his mountain, he attempted to capture the monk so he can eat the latter's flesh and extend his lifespan. Although a young child (by demon standards), he is a fiercely independent kid who lived solitary life away from his parents, even reigning over lesser demons with his mighty power. He tried to lure the travelers by disguising as a innocent boy tied to a tree, they kindly put him down and Sun Wukong (who knows that he's a demon) has to carry him along the way until he prepares to kill him afterwards, but Red Boy tricks him and kidnapped Tang Sanzang. He battles against the monkey king who tries to rescue his master, he then states that he doesn't believe to his statement that his father the Bull Demon King is his sworn brother (which technically made Wukong a relative).

Red Boy then tried to kill Sun Wukong by controlling five carts (each representing one of the Five Elements) that emitted in great amount of fire that had the power to blot out the heavens, but Wukong cast a fire resistance spell and chased after Red Boy, who had gone back into his cave, thinking he had defeated him. Sun Wukong at first asks for some rain from the Eastern Dragon King to counter Red Boy's Samadhi Fire, to no avail (because the Dragon King's rain can only extinguish normal fires, but Red Boy's fire is inextinguishable to normal efforts to quench fire) with the rain in fact intensifying the flames. Caught directly by the flames, Sun Wukong is ultimately almost burned to death and he finally resorts asking for the help of Guanyin.

As Red Boy was fighting Wukong in a forest, he found Guanyin's empty lotus throne, and then in irreverence, sat in it, imitating Guanyin's posture. Suddenly the lotus throne transformed into swords, which pierced and wounded Red Boy, as he attempted to take them out, the swords then transformed into halberds, which trapped him. In pain, Red Boy then pleaded for Guanyin to release him, but In return has to become Guanyin's new disciple and given the Dharma name 'Shancai' (善財). She then withdrew the blades and healed Red Boy's wounds, but Red Boy attempted to attack her only for the Bodhisattva to throw five golden bands and fixed it around his head, wrists and legs which he cannot remove them, Guanyin then recited a mantra to subdue him which tightens the band, immobilizing him and giving out great pain. After being mocked by Sun Wukong, he took his spear and attempted to attack him, only to have Guanyin recite the mantra again, which made Red Boy put his hands together in front of his chest, unable to pull them apart. Red Boy, now with his arms immobilized, could do nothing other than lower his head in a bow of defeat.

Jade-Faced Princess

The Jade-Faced Princess (玉面公主) is Bull Demon King's concubine. Her true form is a vixen. She is killed by Zhu Bajie.

Water Repelling Golden Crystal Beast

The Water Repelling Golden Crystal Beast (避水金晶獸) is Bull Demon King's steed. It is taken away by Sun Wukong.

Wansheng Dragon King and associates
The Wansheng Dragon King (萬聖龍王) is based in Emerald Waves Lake (碧波潭), Rocky Mountain (亂石山), Kingdom of Jisai (祭賽國). He marries his daughter, Wansheng Princess, to the Nine-Headed Beast. He plots with his son-in-law to steal a Śarīra from the pagoda in Golden Ray Monastery (金光寺) in Jisai and release a rain of blood in the kingdom. Without the Śarīra, the pagoda loses its magical shine, and the king perceives the blood rain as an ill omen. He believes that the monks in the monastery are responsible for stealing the Śarīra and starts persecuting them. Sun Wukong uncovers the truth when he and his companions arrive in Jisai. The dragon king and his family are eventually killed by Sun Wukong and Zhu Bajie. The Śarīra is returned to the pagoda.

The Wansheng Princess (萬聖公主) is Wansheng Dragon King's daughter and the Nine-Headed Beast's wife. She stole the Nine Leaves Lingzhi Herb (九葉靈芝草) from the Queen Mother of the West. She is slain by Zhu Bajie.

The Nine-Headed Beast (九頭蟲), also known as the Nine-Headed Prince Consort (九頭駙馬), is married to Wansheng Dragon King's daughter. He is armed with a Crescent Moon Spade (月牙鏟). He collaborates with his father-in-law to steal the Śarīra from Golden Ray Monastery. Sun Wukong enlists the help of celestial forces to deal with the demons. The Nine-Headed Beast has one of his heads bitten off by Erlang Shen's celestial hound but manages to escape.

Benbo'erba (奔波兒灞) and Babo'erben (灞波兒奔) are two minions of the Nine-Headed Beast. Their respective forms are a sheatfish and a blackfish respectively. They stay at the top of the pagoda in Golden Ray Monastery after the Śarīra is stolen. Sun Wukong discovers them while cleaning the pagoda and captures them. He learns about the theft of the Śarīra from them.

Tree Spirits
A group of tree spirits are based in Wood Immortal Temple (木仙庵) at Bramble Ridge (荊棘嶺). The four most senior spirits are Jinjie Shiba Gong (勁節十八公), Guzhi Gong (孤直公), Lingkongzi (凌空子) and Fuyun Sou (拂雲叟), who appear in human form as four old men. Their true forms are a pine tree, a cedar tree, a juniper tree and a bamboo tree respectively. Tang Sanzang encounters them in the temple and discusses poetry with them. Other spirits include the Naked Demon (赤身鬼) and the Apricot Immortal (杏仙), whose true forms are a maple tree and an apricot tree respectively, while their servants are flower spirits. Sun Wukong sees through their disguise and tells Zhu Bajie when the latter asks him if he detects any demons in the vicinity. Zhu Bajie then destroys all the trees on his-own initiative. Tang Sanzang is shocked and he scolds Zhu Bajie for killing innocents because the spirits never harmed him, but Sun Wukong explains that it is best to eliminate the spirits now, in case they become evil in the future.

Yellow Brows Great King
The Yellow Brows Great King (黃眉大王) is actually a servant boy who helps Maitreya play the sounding stone. When his master was away, he stole the Human Sack (人種袋) and Golden Cymbals (金鐃) and escaped to strike-out on his-own and become a demon lord. He transforms his sounding stone into a Wolf's Teeth Club (狼牙棒) as his weapon. He creates a fake Leiyin Temple and impersonates the Buddha while his minions disguise themselves as the Buddha's followers. Tang Sanzang, Zhu Bajie and Sha Wujing fall for his ruse as they mistakenly believe that they have reached their destination, and are captured by him. Sun Wukong tries to save his companions but Yellow Brows traps him in the Golden Cymbals. Sun Wukong escapes later and brings various divine forces to help him counter the demon but Yellow Brows uses the Human Sack to trap all the reinforcements. At the critical moment, Maitreya shows up and suggests to Sun Wukong to transform into a watermelon. The unsuspecting Yellow Brows eats the watermelon and Sun Wukong causes agony to the demon inside his stomach. Yellow Brows surrenders and is eventually taken back by Maitreya.

Python Demon
The Python Demon (蟒蛇精) is based in Tuoluo Manor (駝羅庄) on Qijue Mountain (七絕山). She is armed with a pair of spears, which were actually tips of her forked tongue. Her true form is a giant python with red scales and glowing eyes. She has eaten many people and animals living in that area. She meets her end when Sun Wukong enters her body and breaks out of her stomach.

Sai Tai Sui
Sai Tai Sui (賽太歲; literally "Equivalent to Tai Sui") is a demon king based on Qilin Mountain (麒麟山) in the Kingdom of Zhuzi (朱紫國). He is actually the Golden Haired Hou (金毛犼), the steed of Guanyin. Armed with a Broad Axe (宣花鉞斧), he also has with him a set of three magic bells, known as the Purple-Gold Bells (紫金鈴), which can conjure fire, smoke and dust storms when rung. He kidnaps the Lady of Jinsheng Palace (金聖宮娘娘), one of the king’s favourite concubines, and tries to force her to marry him. Unknown to him, the Immortal Ziyang (紫陽真人) has secretly cast a protective shield on the lady, such that anyone who touches her will feel like being pricked by thorns. Sun Wukong uses tricks to steal the bells from Sai Tai Sui and then uses them against the demon. The demon is eventually subdued and taken back by Guanyin.

Spider Demons and Hundred-Eyed Demon Lord

The Spider Demons (蜘蛛精) are seven sisters based in Silk Cave (盤絲洞) at Silk Ridge (盤絲嶺). As their names suggest, their true forms are spiders. Tang Sanzang stumbles upon their thatched hut while begging for alms and tries to leave after suspecting that they are demons. However, it is too late as the demons emit spider silk from their navels and spin a web to trap Tang Sanzang. They are defeated by Sun Wukong later and have no choice but to release Tang Sanzang. The spiders are later squashed to death by Sun Wukong.

The Hundred-Eyed Demon Lord (百眼魔君), also known as the Multiple-Eyed Creature (多目怪), is a centipede demon based in Yellow Flower Temple (黃花觀). He has a thousand eyes that radiate brilliant golden light to confuse his enemies and victims. He is the seven spider demons' senior and disguises himself as a Taoist. The spiders approach him for help in taking revenge after their defeat at the hands of Sun Wukong. He offers the protagonists poisoned drinks when they stop for a rest at his temple but Sun Wukong sees through his ruse. He seizes Tang Sanzang and holds him hostage, while Sun Wukong captures the seven spiders. He refuses to exchange Tang Sanzang for his juniors and Sun Wukong kills the spiders in anger. He is eventually subdued and captured by Pilanpo Bodhisattva and sent to guard the Thousand Flowers Cave (千花洞) at Purple Clouds Mountain (紫雲山).

Three Demon Kings at Lion Camel Ridge
The Three Demon Kings are based in Lion Camel Cave (獅駝洞) at Lion Camel Ridge (獅駝嶺). Sun Wukong first learns about this trinity of demon kings from Xiaozuanfeng (小鑽風), one of their minions he had captured. The three are:

The Azure Lion (青毛獅子) is actually the steed of Manjusri which previously appeared in an earlier chapter as the Lion-Lynx Demon. He is armed with a bronze saber. He is capable of transforming himself into several times bigger or smaller than his normal size. It is said that he once showed up uninvited at a peach feast hosted by the Queen Mother of the West and wanted to fight for the rulership of Heaven. The Jade Emperor sent 100,000 celestial troops to capture the demon, who turned into a giant monster and devoured the entire army in one gulp. The Azure Lion swallows Sun Wukong, who causes trouble inside his stomach. The Lion then pretends to agree to open his mouth and let Sun Wukong out, but intends to bite him to death when he comes out. However, anticipating the demon's intentions, Sun Wukong sticks his Ruyi Jingu Bang out-ahead of him instead and the demon breaks his teeth after biting on the staff. Sun Wukong later creates a long rope, ties it around the demon's heart and plays with it after leaving the demon's stomach. The Azure Lion is eventually subdued and taken back by Manjusri.

The Golden Winged Great Peng (金翅大鵬雕) is armed with a ji-polearm and is capable of flying over great distances. He possesses a Flask of Yin and Yang Essence (陰陽二氣瓶) which can suck in unsuspecting victims (similar to the Purple Gold Red Gourd and the Suet Jade Flask, two of Taishang Laojun 5 sacred treasures, mentioned-above). After a while, the victim trapped inside the flask will be reduced to a bloody mash. He uses the flask to trap Sun Wukong but the latter breaks out and the flask is rendered useless because its essence has been spilt. The demon is later revealed to be actually a brother of the peacock Mahamayuri (the Buddha's godmother), as both of them were born to the Fenghuang. The Buddha shows up to subdue the demon and take him back to Vulture Peak.

The Yellow Toothed Elephant (黃牙老象) is actually the white elephant that the bodhisattva Samantabhadra rides on. He appears as a giant with an elephant-like face, and is armed with a spear. He has a long nose capable of trapping enemies and crushing them. While fighting with Zhu Bajie, he uses his nose to wrap around him and capture him. He is eventually subdued and taken back by Samantabhadra.

White Deer Spirit and White-Faced Vixen Spirit
The White Deer Spirit (白鹿精) is actually the mount of the deity Old Man of the South Pole (南極老人). He stole his master's staff and escaped into the human world. He accepts the White-Faced Vixen Spirit (白面狐狸精), a female Fox spirit/Huli jing, as an adopted-daughter, disguises her as a beautiful maiden, and presents her to the ruler of the Kingdom of Biqiu (比丘國). The king is entranced by the vixen's charming looks and marries her, while the white deer (disguised as a middle-aged man) becomes the royal father-in-law (國丈). The king gradually falls sick under the demons' influence, and the white deer lies that the hearts of 1,111 children are required to make a cure. The king then issues an order to capture 1,111 children and imprison them in cages, preparing to have them killed and their hearts harvested. When the protagonists arrive in Biqiu, the white deer tells the king that Tang Sanzang's heart is the best cure so the king orders Tang Sanzang to be arrested. Sun Wukong saves the children and exposes the demons' true forms. The vixen is slain by Zhu Bajie and the white deer is subdued and taken back by the Old Man of the South Pole.

Lady Earth Flow
Lady Earth Flow (地涌夫人) is actually a Golden Nosed Albino Rat Spirit (金鼻白毛老鼠精) who attained her powers after practising Taoist arts for 300 years. She once secretly consumed the Fragrant Blossoms Precious Candles (香花寶燭) at Vulture Peak, and called herself "Half-Guanyin" (半截觀音). She was captured by Li Jing and Nezha, and was supposed to be killed, but the Buddha told them to spare her life, and she was so grateful that she acknowledged Li Jing as her godfather and Nezha as her godbrother. She later moved to the Bottomless Pit (無底洞) at Flaming Air Mountain (焰空山) and renamed herself "Lady Earth Flow". She is armed with a pair of swords. When the protagonists pass by Black Pines Forest (黑松林), she disguises herself as a damsel in distress to attract Tang Sanzang's attention. Tang Sanzang takes pity on her and lets her accompany them to a nearby temple, but Sun Wukong sees through her cover. She ate six monks in the temple and captures Tang Sanzang when Sun Wukong and the others are distracted. Sun Wukong finds out her true identity later and brings Li Jing and Nezha to subdue her and take her back to Heaven.

Ruler of the Kingdom of Miefa
The Ruler of the Kingdom of Miefa (滅法國; "Miefa" literally means "destroy dharma") hates Buddhists and once made an oath to slaughter 10,000 Buddhist monks. He has already killed 9,996 monks when the protagonists arrive in Miefa. To evade trouble, the protagonists disguise themselves as horse traders and hide in a big cupboard in an inn. However, that night, the cupboard is stolen by thieves but is recovered by the authorities and brought to the court. Sun Wukong cast sleeping spells on the royal household and officials and shaved their heads. The next morning, the king wakes up and is shocked to see that he, his family members, and his subjects are bald, just like Buddhist monks. He realizes that he has done wrong in persecuting Buddhist monks so he repents and renames his domain "Kingdom of Qinfa" (欽法國; "Qinfa" literally means "respect for dharma").

King of the Southern Hill
The King of the Southern Hill (南山大王) is a demon king based in Linked Cave (連環洞), Bent Peak (折岳), Hidden Misty Mountain (隱霧山). He is armed with an iron pestle (鐵杵) and is capable of creating windstorms and mist. He is less powerful than other demon kings in the novel, but is considered one of the wittiest. He uses a plan called the "strategy of separating the plum blossom's petals" (分瓣梅花计) to lure Sun Wukong, Zhu Bajie and Sha Wujing away in-turn from Tang Sanzang, in three different instances and then captures Tang. Sun Wukong infiltrates his lair and casts a sleeping spell on the demon and his minions and saves Tang Sanzang. The demon is slain by Zhu Bajie just as he awakes, and his true form is revealed to be a leopard with mugwort-shaped patterns on its body.

Grand Saint of Nine Spirits and associates
The Grand Saint of Nine Spirits (九靈元聖) is actually the Nine-Headed Lion that Taiyi Jiuku Tianzun rides on. The boy in charge of looking after the lion once secretly drank a special potion and fell asleep for three days in Heaven (equivalent to three years in the human world). The lion seizes the opportunity to escape. He builds his base at the Jiuqu Panhuan Cave (九曲盤桓洞) at Bamboo Links Mountain (竹節山) near the Kingdom of Yuhua (玉華國). The clan of lion demons living around that area revere him as their grand spiritual ancestor. The Nine-Headed Lion is different from most other demons in the novel in a sense that he neither harms humans nor seeks to taste Tang Sanzang's flesh; he is angered when he learns that his god-grandson, the Tawny Lion Demon, has been killed by Sun Wukong, and wants to take revenge. He captures Tang Sanzang, Zhu Bajie, Sha Wujing and the royal family of Yuhua, and has them-all whipped. He is eventually subdued by his master, Taiyi Jiuku Tianzun, and taken back to Heaven.

The Tawny Lion Demon (黃獅精) is based in Tiger's Jaws Cave (虎口洞), up-upon the Leopard's Head Mountain (豹頭山) in the Kingdom of Yuhua. He is armed with a Four Clears Spade (四明鏟). He is a god-grandson of the Nine-Headed Lion. Once, overcome by greed, he steals Sun Wukong, Zhu Bajie and Sha Wujing's weapons. Although he does not harm humans and shows no interest in tasting Tang Sanzang's flesh, it is his avarice that ultimately leads to disaster for him; he steals the pilgrims weapons. Sun Wukong and his companions attack his cave and slaughter him and his minions to take back their weapons. His death is the catalyst for the conflict between the protagonists and the Nine-Headed Lion.

Roushi (猱獅), Xueshi (雪獅), Suanni (狻猊), Baize (白澤), Fuli (伏狸) and Boxiang (摶象) are six lion demons who used to inhabit the Jiuqu Panhuan Cave before the Nine-Headed Lion came. They honour the Nine-Headed Lion as their grand spiritual ancestor. They are captured by Sun Wukong and his companions and executed.

Kings of Cold, Heat and Dust Protection
The King of Cold Protection (辟寒大王), King of Heat Protection (辟暑大王) and King of Dust Protection (辟塵大王) are three demons based in Xuanying Cave (玄英洞), Azure Dragon Mountain (青龍山) in Jinping Prefecture (金平府). They are armed with a battleaxe, a broadsword, and a rattan staff respectively. Their true forms are rhinoceroses. They disguise themselves as buddhas and steal aromatic oil from lamps on a bridge, tricking worshippers into believing that the "buddhas" have accepted the oil offered to them. When Tang Sanzang goes to pay respect to the "buddhas", the demons instead capture him and flee. Sun Wukong and company try to save their master but are outnumbered by the demons and their minions, so they seek help from celestial forces. The demons are eventually defeated and killed by the combined efforts of Sun Wukong and company, the four Wood beasts of the 28 Mansions (Wood Wolf of Legs, Wood Dragon of Horn, Wood Dog of Well and Wood Dear of Dipper), and marine forces led by Crown Prince Mo'ang.

Jade Rabbit Spirit

The Jade Rabbit Spirit (玉兔精) is actually the moon rabbit that pounds a mortar and pestle in Guanghan Palace (廣寒宮) on the Moon. The fairy Su'e (素娥) once hit her and she bore a grudge against her. Su'e was later reincarnated as a princess of India (天竺). The rabbit escapes into the human world to take revenge against Su'e. She lives in Maoying Mountain (毛穎山) and wields a short staff (transformed from the pestle) as her weapon. She kidnaps the princess of India and impersonates her. She meets Tang Sanzang when he passes by India on his journey, and wants to marry him so that she can absorb his yang essence and increase her powers. Sun Wukong sees through her disguise and fights with her. Just as Sun Wukong is about to defeat the Jade Rabbit, the moon goddess, Chang'e, shows up, stops him, assumes custody of the wayward-rabbit, and takes her back to the Moon and to her work.

Great White Turtle
The Great White Turtle (大白龜) is a giant turtle based in Heaven Reaching River (通天河). He was forced out of his underwater residence by the King of Spiritual Touch. Sun Wukong brings Guanyin to subdue and take away the demon. He feels so grateful to the protagonists for helping him take back his home that he ferries them across the 800 li river on his back. Before moving on, Tang Sanzang promises to help the turtle ask the Buddha when he will be able to transform into a human. However, Tang Sanzang forgets his promise when he arrives at his destination, Vulture Peak, where the Buddha is based. The guardians transporting the protagonists back to Chang'an drop them off abruptly at Heaven Reaching River, where the protagonists meet the turtle again. While ferrying the protagonists across the river, the turtle asks Tang Sanzang about the promise he made and the latter apologises for breaking his word. The unhappy turtle throws them off his back into the water and they swim to the shore. This incident fulfils the last of the 81 tribulations that Tang Sanzang is destined to face on his journey to obtain the real scriptures.

Historical figures

 Li Shimin, Emperor Taizong of Tang (唐太宗李世民)

 Wei Zheng (魏徵)

 Xu Maogong (徐懋功)

 Yuchi Gong (尉遲恭)

 Qin Qiong (秦瓊)

 Xiao Yu (蕭瑀)

 Fu Yi (傅奕)

 Yin Kaishan (殷開山)

 Yuan Tiangang (袁天罡)

 Li Chunfeng (李淳風)

 Li Yuan, Emperor Gaozu of Tang (唐高祖李淵)

 Li Jiancheng (李建成)

 Li Yuanji (李元吉)

 Xu Jingzong (許敬宗)

 Wang Gui (王珪)

 Xue Rengui (薛仁貴)

 Liu Hongji (劉弘基)

 Duan Zhixian (段志賢)

 Ma Sanbao (馬三寶)

 Cheng Yaojin (程咬金)

 Gao Shilian (高士廉)

 Zhang Gongjin (張公謹)

 Fang Xuanling (房玄齡)

 Du Ruhui (杜如晦)

Others

 The Seven Sages (七聖) are a group of demon kings who became sworn brothers with Sun Wukong which makes him one of them, one of the demon kings is the Bull Demon King while the other five are the Flood Dragon Demon King (蛟魔王), Peng Demon King (鵬魔王), Lion Camel King (獅駝王), Macaque King (獼猴王) and Marmoset King (禺狨王).

 Liu Boqin (劉伯欽) is a hunter who protects Tang Sanzang from wild beasts and provides him with food and shelter. He introduces the latter to Sun Wukong, who was trapped under a mountain by the Buddha.

 Gao Cuilan (高翠蘭) is a woman forced by Zhu Bajie to be his wife.

 Squire Gao (高員外) is Gao Cuilan's father.

 Crown Prince Mo'ang (摩昂太子) is the eldest son of the Dragon of the West who helped Sun Wukong defeat his cousin Tuolong.

 
Lists of literary characters
Lists of fictional Chinese people